Francisco de Paula Van Halen y Gil (3 March 1814, Vic - 11 February 1887, Madrid) was a Spanish painter, known primarily for battle scenes and other historical works.

Biography
Long thought to be a nephew of the General and military adventurer, Juan Van Halen, recent research by Juan Van Halen Acedo indicates that he was probably the General's son.

He began his career in Barcelona, then moved to Madrid, where he enrolled at the Real Academia de Bellas Artes de San Fernando and studied with José Aparicio.  In 1838, he made his public début at the age of twenty-four with his rendering of the death of Don Álvaro de Luna; displayed at an exposition of the "Liceo Artistico y Literario".

After that, he found work as an illustrator and engraver for some of Madrid's major magazines. He also edited several collections of lithographs, including La España Pintoresca y Artística, El Museo Histórico Español and Museo Militar. One of his most popular collections, which was reissued in the 1950s, was Función de Toros.

In 1851, he was named a court painter for Queen Isabel II and was elected a member of the San Fernando Academy. His work for the Queen included the creation of  scientific drawings for the Museo Nacional de Ciencias Naturales and one of his two best-known battle paintings, the "Batalla de los Siete Condes" was commissioned by her. Many of his other paintings are on display in the Royal Palace. From 1860, he was a frequent participant in the National Exhibition of Fine Arts.

His wife, Margarita, was the sister of poet and progressive politician, . He was a Commander in the Order of Isabella the Catholic. A street in Vic is named after him.

References

Further reading
Carmen Mañas Cano and Enrique Arias Anglés, "El pintor Van Halen en el Patrimonio Nacional (su vida y su obra)", Reales Sitios, #64, 1980, pgs. 21-29.

External links 

Sketches and lithographs by Van Halen @ the Biblioteca Digital Hispánica.

1814 births
1887 deaths
19th-century Spanish painters
19th-century Spanish male artists
Spanish male painters
History painters
Military art
Recipients of the Order of Isabella the Catholic
People from Vic
Spanish people of Flemish descent
Real Academia de Bellas Artes de San Fernando alumni